Ludmil Ivanov Staikov (born 18 October 1937) is a Bulgarian film director. He directed six films between 1972 and 1988. His 1972 film Affection won the Golden Prize at the 8th Moscow International Film Festival. His film Time of Violence (1988) was screened in the Un Certain Regard section at the 1988 Cannes Film Festival.

Filmography
 Affection (1972)
 Amendment to the Law for the Defense of the State (1976)
 Illusion (1980)
 Aszparuh (1981)
 681 AD: The Glory of the Khan (1984)
 Time of Violence (1988)

References

External links

1937 births
Living people
People from Sofia
Film people from Sofia
Bulgarian filmmakers
Bulgarian film directors
National Academy for Theatre and Film Arts alumni
Academic staff of the National Academy for Theatre and Film Arts
Members of the Bulgarian Academy of Sciences